The Breast of National Lampoon: A Collection of Sexual Humor, is an American humor book that was first published in 1972. The book was a special issue of National Lampoon magazine, so it was sold on newsstands; however, it was put out in addition to the regular issues of the magazine. The book is a "best-of", a compilation of pieces that had already been published in the magazine, pieces that had been created by the National Lampoon's regular contributors.

The book included written pieces by Michael O'Donoghue, Chris Miller, Doug Kenney, Sean Kelly and Tony Hendra, and artwork by Arnold Roth.

References

 A list of National Lampoon books
 Amazon listing here

Breast
1972 books